Winston W. "Bud" Gardner Jr. (born October 27, 1938) was an American politician in the state of Florida.

Gardner was born in Montgomery, Alabama. He moved to Florida in 1965. He served as a member of the Brevard County, Florida School Board from 1973 to 1978. He served in the Florida House of Representatives from 1978 to 1988, representing district 31 and district 45. He served as a member of The Florida Senate from 1988 to 1992 representing District 17. He is a member of the Democratic party.

References

Living people
1938 births
Democratic Party members of the Florida House of Representatives
People from Titusville, Florida